Annaberg is a town in the district of Lilienfeld in the Austrian state of Lower Austria.

History
In September 2013 the village was the location of a shooting in which three police officers and an ambulance driver died after a poacher opened fire.

Population

References

Cities and towns in Lilienfeld District